Andrea D. Tullos is a lieutenant general in the United States Air Force who serves as the commander and president of the Air University. She previously served as deputy commander of the Air Education and Training Command. She has also commanded the Second Air Force at Keesler Air Force Base. In April 2021, she was assigned to become the deputy commander of the Air Education and Training Command, replacing Major General William A. Spangenthal. In May 2022, she was nominated for promotion to lieutenant general and assignment as the commander and president of Air University.

Education
1991 Bachelor of Arts, Foreign Affairs, University of Virginia, Charlottesville
1997 Master of Arts, Sociology, University of New Mexico, Albuquerque

Awards and decorations
Tullos's major awards and decorations include:

Effective dates of promotion
Dates of rank are as follows:

References

External links

Living people
Female generals of the United States Air Force
Recipients of the Air Force Distinguished Service Medal
Recipients of the Legion of Merit
University of Virginia alumni
University of New Mexico alumni
Year of birth missing (living people)
21st-century American women